IFK Strömstad is a Swedish football club located in Strömstad.

Background
IFK Strömstad currently (2023) plays in Division 4 Bohuslän/Dalsland which is the sixth tier of Swedish football. The club's best seasons were in 1987 and 1988 when they finished second in Division 2 Västra. They play their home matches at the Strömsvallen in Strömstad.

The club is affiliated to Bohusläns Fotbollförbund. IFK Strömstad have competed in the Svenska Cupen on 17 occasions and have played 26 matches in the competition.

Season to season

Footnotes

External links
  of IFK Strömstad 

Football clubs in Västra Götaland County
Association football clubs established in 1907
1907 establishments in Sweden
Idrottsföreningen Kamraterna